Puerto Escondido may refer to:

Puerto Escondido, Córdoba, Colombia
Puerto Escondido, Oaxaca, Mexico
Puerto Escondido, Baja California Sur, Mexico
Puerto escondido (film), a 1992 Italian film